York Hotel may refer to:

 York Hotel, Kalgoorlie, a heritage hotel in Western Australia
 York Hotel, Adelaide, a 19th century Australian hotel developed by C. A. Hornabrook
 York Hotel, Redcar, an English hotel that was the site of the York Hotel Fire in 1970.